Sylvie Blocher (born 1953) is a French artist.

Blocher is known for her video works that engage local communities. Her long-running project Living Pictures is a series of video portraits that, according to Blocher, attempts to "render speech in images".

Solo exhibitions
1995 Feminin/ Masculin Centre Pompidou, Paris
1998 Living Pictures York University Art Gallery, Toronto
2007 Living Pictures/Men in Gold San Francisco Museum of Modern Art
2010 Sylvie Blocher: What is Missing?, Museum of Contemporary Art, Sydney
2015 S'inventer Autrement Mudam Luxembourg and Centre Regional d’Art Contemporain Languedoc-Roussillon, Seite
2016 Living Pictures Musée d'art et d'histoire de Saint-Denis, Saint-Deins, France

Collections
Her work is included in the collections of the Musée national des beaux-arts du Québec, the Institut d’art contemporain Villeurbanne/Rhône-Alpes, MUDAM Luxembourg, the Centre Pompidou and the San Francisco Museum of Modern Art

References

External links
Official site

1953 births
20th-century French women artists
21st-century French women artists
Women video artists
Living people